Matakana Island is located in the western Bay of Plenty in New Zealand's North Island. The island has been continuously populated for centuries by Māori tribes that are mostly associated with Ngāi Te Rangi.

A smaller island, Rangiwaea Island, is located just offshore from Matakana's southern coast.

As of the 2018 census, the island has a population of 183 people, down from 255 people in the 2013 Census. This makes Matakana Island the third least populated area in the Western Bay of Plenty. There are only 90 inhabited dwellings. Most people living on the island belong to the Ratana Church or the Catholic Church.

History and culture

Recent history
19th Century: Of the 290,000 acres the Crown seized in the Tauranga region in 1865, 240,000 acres were returned to Maori between 1865- 1886. The confiscated 50,000 acres did not include Matakana Island. Matakana Island is 15,000 acres.  The 5000 acre western side of the island (farmland part) was purchased by Whittaker and Russell between 1869-1873. Whittaker and Russell then sold that 5000 acres on 2 April 1874 to the crown who then gave it back for no cost to the same Maori who had previously sold it. The coastal sand dunes of 10,000 acres were purchased by William Daldy of Auckland (1816 – 5 October 1903).  A certificate of title under the Land Transfer Act 1870 was issued to Daldy on 3 August 1878. That transaction relates to the Wiakoura, Oturoa, Paretata, Omanuwhiri, Ohinetama, Wairaka, Pukekahu, Okotare and Hori Tupaea's Pa blocks.

20th Century: Between 1993 and 1999 the ownership of Matakana Island's  forest and freehold land was in dispute. The case Arklow Investments Limited and Christopher Wingate v I.D. MacLean and others, (UKPC 51) was appealed from the New Zealand Court of Appeal to the Judicial Committee of the Privy Council in London.

Marae

Matakana Island has three marae affiliated with Ngāi Te Rangi hapū. Kutaroa Marae and its Tauaiti meeting house are affiliated with Ngāti Tauaiti. Opureora Marae and its Tuwhiwhia meeting house are affiliated with Ngāi Tuwhiwhia and Ngāti Tauaiti. Te Rangihouhiri or Oruarahi Marae and its Te Rangihouhiri meeting house are affiliated with Ngāi Tamawhariua.

In October 2020, the Government committed $4,871,246 from the Provincial Growth Fund to upgrade Te Rangihouhiri Marae and 11 other Ngāti Awa marae, creating 23 jobs.

There is also two marae sites on neighbouring Rangiwaea Island belonging to Ngāi Te Rangi hapū. Rangiwaea Marae and its meeting house, Te Haka a Te Tupere, are a meeting place for Ngāi Tauwhao. The Oponui Marae site, which was dismantled between the 1980s and 2007, was traditionally a meeting place for Te Ngare.

Demographics

Matakana Island had a population of 183 at the 2018 New Zealand census, a decrease of 72 people (−28.2%) since the 2013 census, and a decrease of 42 people (−18.7%) since the 2006 census. There were 78 households, comprising 87 males and 96 females, giving a sex ratio of 0.91 males per female. The median age was 40.6 years (compared with 37.4 years nationally), with 33 people (18.0%) aged under 15 years, 33 (18.0%) aged 15 to 29, 81 (44.3%) aged 30 to 64, and 36 (19.7%) aged 65 or older.

Ethnicities were 13.1% European/Pākehā, 95.1% Māori, and 1.6% Pacific peoples. People may identify with more than one ethnicity.

The percentage of people born overseas was 3.3, compared with 27.1% nationally.

Although some people chose not to answer the census's question about religious affiliation, 27.9% had no religion, 32.8% were Christian, 27.9% had Māori religious beliefs and 1.6% had other religions.

Of those at least 15 years old, 18 (12.0%) people had a bachelor's or higher degree, and 33 (22.0%) people had no formal qualifications. The median income was $20,100, compared with $31,800 nationally. 6 people (4.0%) earned over $70,000 compared to 17.2% nationally. The employment status of those at least 15 was that 54 (36.0%) people were employed full-time, 36 (24.0%) were part-time, and 3 (2.0%) were unemployed.

Geography

The island protects the entrance to the Tauranga harbour and stretches from Bowentown to Mount Maunganui. Matakana Island is largely covered with pine trees although some land is cleared for the residents. Matakana Island has a relatively small population density of 4.2, though still more than the West Coast(1.3 as of the 2006 Census). The island is the third largest by area associated with the North Island, or the fifteenth largest within New Zealand waters.

The island's long, white sandy beach is popular with surfers. Surfers can either catch a water taxi from Mount Maunganui or paddle to the island across the mouth of Tauranga Harbour (depending on weather conditions). Matakana's surf side is a nesting site for a large number of sea birds, including the endangered New Zealand dotterel. In 2007 the New Zealand Fisheries Management Research Database recorded and estimated that there were 325 sting rays inhabiting the estuarial waters between Matakana Island and Rangiwaea Island.

Education

See also 
 List of islands of New Zealand

References

External links 

 Last step in Matakana Island pursuit
 Matakana Island Surf Report

Barrier islands
Western Bay of Plenty District
Islands of the Bay of Plenty Region
Populated places around the Tauranga Harbour